1981–82 was the sixty-ninth occasion on which the Lancashire Cup completion had been held.
 
Leigh won the trophy  by beating Widnes by the score of 8-3
The match was played at Central Park, Wigan, (historically in the county of Lancashire). The attendance was 9,011 and receipts were £14,029.00

Background 

This season saw the introduction of two new clubs, Carlisle and Fulham, neither in Lancashire, but classed as “Western”. Thus the total number of teams entering the competition increased from 14 to a full complement of 16.
With this full sixteen members there was no need for “blank” or “dummy” fixtures or any byes.

Competition and results

Round 1 
Involved  8 matches (with no byes) and 16 clubs

Round 2 - Quarter-finals 
Involved 4 matches and 8 clubs

Round 3 – Semi-finals  
Involved 2 matches and 4 clubs

Final

Teams and scorers 

Scoring - Try = three points - Goal = two points - Drop goal = one point

The road to success

Notes and comments 
1  * The first Lancashire Cup match played by the newly elected Carlisle team and also at this stadium, Carlisle United's Brunton Park
2 * The first Lancashire Cup match played by the newly elected Fulham team and also at this stadium, Fulham's Craven Cottage
3 * Central Park was the home ground of Wigan with a final capacity of 18,000, although the record attendance was  47,747 for Wigan v St Helens 27 March 1959

See also 
1981–82 Rugby Football League season
Rugby league county cups

References

External links
Saints Heritage Society
1896–97 Northern Rugby Football Union season at wigan.rlfans.com 
Hull&Proud Fixtures & Results 1896/1897
Widnes Vikings - One team, one passion Season In Review - 1896-97
The Northern Union at warringtonwolves.org

1981 in English rugby league
RFL Lancashire Cup